Walid Khalid Afat  is an Iraqi football defender who played for Iraq in the 1996 Asian Cup. He also played for Al-Quwa Al-Jawiya

Walid Khalid was a regular during Iraq's 1996 Asian Cup campaign.

His last call up during the 2000 Asian Cup qualifiers and the Pan-Arab Games in 1999. He made 12 appearances for the Iraqi national team.

References

External links

Iraqi footballers
Iraq international footballers
1996 AFC Asian Cup players
Living people
Association football defenders
Year of birth missing (living people)